Nalas (also Romanized as Nalās) is a village in Melkari Rural District of Vazineh District of Sardasht County, West Azerbaijan province, Iran. At the 2006 National Census, its population was 5,891 in 1,088 households. The following census in 2011 counted 6,985 people in 1,740 households. The latest census in 2016 showed a population of 8,503 people in 2,125 households; it was the largest village in its rural district.

References 

Sardasht County

Populated places in West Azerbaijan Province

Populated places in Sardasht County